Yambe may be,

Yambe language, Gabon
Rufin Yambe